Felix Ovudoroye Ibru (7 December 1935 – 12 March 2016) was a Nigerian architect the first democratically elected Governor of Delta State and Senator for Delta Central Senatorial District. Until his death he held the position of President General of the Urhobo Progressive Union (UPU).
As a traditional chieftain of his homeland, Ibru bore the tribal honorific Olorogun and often used it as a pre-nominal style. This title is also borne by many of the members of his large family in the same way.

Background

Ibru was born on 7 December 1935 at Agbarha-Otor in the Ughelli North local government area of Delta State to Chief Peter Epete Ibru and Chief (Mrs). Janet Omotogor Ibru, the second of seven children.
His brother Michael Ibru is the founder of the Ibru Organization, a major conglomerate.
He was educated at Yaba Methodist School, and later Igbobi College where he was Head Boy in 1955. He won the Elder Dempster Lines Scholarship to travel to the United Kingdom. After his secondary school education at Igbobi College, Ibru proceeded to the Nottingham School of Architecture in England where he qualified as an Architect in 1962.

While a student in Nottingham, he was elected the first Black President of the British Council with responsibility for Nottinghamshire, Derbyshire, Lincolnshire and Leicestershire. As a result, he was presented to Queen Elizabeth II and Prince Philip, Duke of Edinburgh at a ceremony in Buckingham Palace in 1960 Shortly after his qualification as an architect in 1962, he worked briefly with the Jewish Agency SOCHNUT, on various projects relating to farm settlements (kibbutzim and moshavim) and prefabricated buildings in Jerusalem and Haifa. He later enrolled at the Technion – Israel Institute of Technology for post-graduate studies and qualified with an MSc (Arch) in 1963. He returned to Nigeria at the end of that year and took up an appointment with the Nigerian Federal Ministry of Education as the first resident Lecturer in Architecture at the Yaba College of Technology.

He was elected member of the Nigerian Institute of Architects (NIA) in 1969, registered by the Architects registration Council of Nigeria in (ARCON) 1971, and elected Fellow of the Nigerian Institute of Architects in 1995. In 1997 he was awarded an honorary degree of Doctor of Laws (LL.D) by the Delta State University and a Fellowship of the Nigerian Institute of Public Relations (NIPR).

Business career

Ibru established an architectural firm, Roye Ibru Associates, which, in 1971, went into partnership with Alan Vaughan-Richards and Associates to establish the firm of Ibru Vaughan-Richards and Associates (Planning Partnership). As one of the two principal partners of the firm, Chief Ibru was involved in the design and supervision of more than 40 projects across the country. They include:
University of Lagos Sports Centre,
Oguta Lake Resort,
The Diette-Spiff Civic Centre, Port Harcourt,
Office extension for Elf Nig. Ltd. Victoria Island,
Lagos University master plan,
New Layout Market, Port Harcourt,
Mile 3 Diobu Market, Port Harcourt,
Sheraton Lagos Hotel & Towers, Ikeja,
University of Benin sports centre,
University of Benin Master plan,
Faculty of Science buildings, University of Benin & Ogun State and the
Ogun State Polytechnic Master plan.

As consultant to Ibru Prefabs Limited, he was responsible for the design and supervision of several geodesic domes of various dimensions in many parts of the country.
In 1971, under the auspices of the United Nations, he was invited to Tokyo, Japan, as a member of a panel on foreign investment. In 1974, he delivered a lecture at the Harvard Business School, in the United States on Multinationals. It was titled "Emerging Role Of The African Entrepreneur In The Economy And Its Relationship With Multinational Corporations: Competition, Partnership, Cooperation and Absorption".

Political career

Ibru's political activities began in 1983, when he unsuccessfully contested for a seat in the Senate.
He ran for the governorship of Delta State in 1991 and emerged as the first executive governor of the newly created Delta State in 1992.

He won the 2003 senatorial elections for Delta Central.

Personal life
Felix Ibru died on 12 March 2016 at the age of 80.  Ibru was married with 6 children and 6 grandchildren all of whom survive him.

See also
 List of Nigerian architects

References

External links

1935 births
2016 deaths
People from Delta State
Governors of Delta State
Members of the Senate (Nigeria)
Alumni of Nottingham Trent University
Technion – Israel Institute of Technology alumni
Delta State politicians
Academic staff of Yaba College of Technology
Igbobi College alumni
Felix
Nigerian expatriates in Israel
20th-century Nigerian architects
21st-century Nigerian politicians